The All Pacific Championship was the secondary singles women's professional wrestling title in All Japan Women's Pro-Wrestling or AJW.  The belt was started as the Hawaiian Pacific Championship in 1977 and was renamed the All Pacific Championship in 1978.

Title history

Combined reigns

See also

 List of professional wrestling promotions in Japan
 List of women's wrestling promotions
 Professional wrestling in Japan

References

All Japan Women's Pro-Wrestling Championships
Women's professional wrestling championships
Regional professional wrestling championships